Tallur is a small town in Kundapur taluk, Udupi district, Karnataka. It had a population of 3801 as per the 2011 census. It is less than 3 km away from the town of Kundapur and lies on National Highway 66.

The St Francis Assisi Church is located in Tallur.

References 

Villages in Udupi district